"Meant to Live" is a single by alternative rock band Switchfoot. "Meant to Live" was released to radio on January 27, 2003. The song peaked at number five on the US Modern Rock chart and U.S. Adult Top 40 chart, number six on U.S. Top 40 radio, and number 18 on the U.S. Billboard Hot 100. It is the first track on the group's 2003 major-label debut album The Beautiful Letdown, and was also featured in the UK version of the Spider-Man 2 soundtrack. In April 2005, the song was certified gold in the United States. The single is generally regarded as the song that helped the band achieve mainstream success.

Background
Lyrically, "Meant to Live" was inspired by T. S. Eliot's poem "The Hollow Men". Singer/writer Jon Foreman has said, "Maybe the kid in the song is me, hoping that I'm meant for more than arguments and failed attempts to fly. Something deep inside of me yearns for the beautiful, the true. I want more than what I've been sold; I want to live life." According to Foreman, this song was also inspired by U2's "I Still Haven't Found What I'm Looking For".

This track refers to C.S. Lewis's novel Out of the Silent Planet with the lyric "Maybe we're bent and broken."

It also refers to John Steinbeck's novel Of Mice and Men, in the lyric "Dreaming about Providence and whether mice or men have second tries."

Composition
"Meant to Live" is an alternative rock song that lasts for a duration of three minutes and twenty seconds. According to the sheet music published at Musicnotes.com by Capitol CMG, it is written in the time signature of common time, with a heavy, moderately slow rock tempo of 76 beats per minute. "Meant to Live" is composed in the key of B minor, while Jon Foreman's vocal range spans one octave and three notes, from a low of D4 to a high of G5. The song has a basic sequence of B5-A5-E5-G5-A5-B5-A5-E5-D5-G5-E5-A5 during its introduction, changes to G5-F5-D5-E5-D5-F5-D5 in the verses, follows G5-A5-B5-E5-G5-E5 at the refrain, has Dsus2-G6-Dsus2-G6-Dsus2-Em7-Csus2-G5 during its bridge and concludes with Dsus2-G6-B5-A5-E5 in the outro as its chord progression.

The song has a lumbering, incensed post-grunge riff driven by heavy guitars. During its yearning bridge, the musical composition momentarily shifts to shimmery folk-rock. "Meant to Live" features lead singer Jonathan Foreman intoning strong melodies which unite the song's different parts. His lyrical content has a uniquely melancholic yet hopeful tone. Foreman's vulnerable verses contain world-weary lines: "Maybe we've been living with our eyes half open/Maybe we're bent and broken." They express a subtly inspirational feeling as well as suggestion to delve deeper or look higher for fulfillment. "Meant to Live" also harbors some political sentiments, containing the topical lines, "we want more than the wars of our fathers."

Critical reception
Comparing its guitar riff to that of Nirvana's In Utero while complimenting the timelessness of its sentiments, AllMusic's claims that the song "has its cake and eats it too, musically and lyrically speaking." She continued writing, "Meant to Live"'s sympathetic, idealistic (not preachy) viewpoint, combined with its powerful guitars, make the song successful as both an alternative CCM and modern rock single.

Music videos
There were three music videos made for this song. The first video features live performance footage, the second is a concept video depicting the band playing inside a house while the walls and insides are slowly being torn down, showing a resemblance to Nirvana's "Smells Like Teen Spirit" music video, which the "Meant to Live" video has been compared to, and a third video is mixed into clips from Spider-Man 2, and was released exclusively in the UK.

The first two videos featured audio mixed a key higher than the album version.

Awards
In 2005, the song was nominated for a Dove Awards for Song of the Year at the 36th GMA Dove Awards.

Track listing
UK CD single
 "Meant to Live" (album version)
 "On Fire" (live)
 "The Beautiful Letdown" (live)
 "Meant to Live" (video)

Charts

Weekly charts

Year-end charts

Certifications

Release history

References

External links
 

Switchfoot songs
2003 singles
2004 singles
Songs written by Jon Foreman
Songs written by Tim Foreman
Post-grunge songs
2003 songs
Columbia Records singles
Song recordings produced by John Fields (record producer)
Spider-Man (2002 film series)
Songs from Spider-Man films